Laura Hillenbrand (born May 15, 1967) is an American author of books and magazine articles. Her two bestselling nonfiction books, Seabiscuit: An American Legend (2001) and Unbroken: A World War II Story of Survival, Resilience, and Redemption (2010), have sold over 13 million copies, and each was adapted for film. Her writing style is distinct from New Journalism, dropping "verbal pyrotechnics" in favor of a stronger focus on the story itself.

Hillenbrand fell ill in college and was unable to complete her degree. She shared that experience in an award-winning essay, A Sudden Illness, published in The New Yorker in 2003. Her books were written while she was disabled by that illness. In a 2014 interview, Bob Schieffer said to Laura Hillenbrand: "To me your story – battling your disease... is as compelling as his (Louis Zamperini's) story."

Career
Hillenbrand's first book was the acclaimed Seabiscuit: An American Legend (2001), a nonfiction account of the career of the great racehorse Seabiscuit, for which she won the William Hill Sports Book of the Year in 2001. She says she was compelled to tell the story because she "found fascinating people living a story that was improbable, breathtaking and ultimately more satisfying than any story [she'd] ever come across."  She first told the story through an essay, "Four Good Legs Between Us", that was published in American Heritage magazine, and the feedback was positive, so she decided to proceed with a full-length book. The book received positive reviews for the storytelling and research. It was made into the film Seabiscuit, nominated for Best Picture of 2003 at the 76th Academy Awards.

Hillenbrand's second book, Unbroken: A World War II Story of Survival, Resilience, and Redemption (2010), was a biography of World War II hero Louis Zamperini. The book's film adaptation is called Unbroken (2014).

These two books have dominated the best seller lists in both hardback and paperback. Combined, they have sold more than 10 million copies, which was reported in 2016 to have increased to over 13 million copies.

Hillenbrand's essays have appeared in The New Yorker, Equus magazine, American Heritage, The Blood-Horse, Thoroughbred Times, The Backstretch, Turf and Sport Digest, and other publications. Her 1998 American Heritage article on the horse Seabiscuit won the Eclipse Award for Magazine Writing.

Hillenbrand is a co-founder of Operation International Children.

Writing style
Hillenbrand's writing style belongs to a new school of nonfiction writers, who come after the new journalism, focusing more on the story than a literary prose style:

Hillenbrand belongs to a generation of writers who emerged in response to the stylistic explosion of the 1960s. Pioneers of New Journalism like Tom Wolfe and Norman Mailer wanted to blur the line between literature and reportage by infusing true stories with verbal pyrotechnics and eccentric narrative voice. But many of the writers who began to appear in the 1990s ... approached the craft of narrative journalism in a quieter way. They still built stories around characters and scenes, with dialogue and interior perspective, but they cast aside the linguistic showmanship that drew attention to the writing itself.

Personal life
Hillenbrand was born in Fairfax, Virginia, the daughter and youngest of four children of Elizabeth Marie Dwyer, a child psychologist, and Bernard Francis Hillenbrand, a lobbyist who became a minister. 

Hillenbrand spent much of her childhood riding bareback "screaming over the hills" of her father's Sharpsburg, Maryland, farm.  A favorite childhood book of hers was Come On Seabiscuit (1963). "I read it to death, my little paperback copy," she says. She studied at Kenyon College in Gambier, Ohio, but was forced to leave before graduation when she contracted chronic fatigue syndrome, with which she has struggled ever since. 

Until late 2015, she lived in Washington, D.C., and rarely left her house because of the condition. Hillenbrand married Borden Flanagan, a professor of government at American University and her college sweetheart, in 2006. In 2014, they separated after 28 years as a couple, living in separate homes. Their divorce was finalized in 2015.

In January 2015, she was interviewed at length by James Rosen of Fox News, at her home in Georgetown, primarily about how she had written the book Unbroken; Rosen noted her improved health, as the interview had been put off multiple times since 2010, due to her ill health. She mentioned in the interview how her subject, Louis Zamperini, inspired her in facing her own life problems during their many phone calls, with his unfailing optimism. She related that Zamperini had read her essay about her own illness, which was partly why he opened up about his life so thoroughly, trusting that she could understand what he had endured. She stated that her primary literary influences were all writers of fiction, including Hemingway, Tolstoy, Jane Austen, but their command of language is what brings her to re-read books by those authors.

In fall 2015, Hillenbrand made a trip by road to Oregon, her first time out of Washington D. C. since 1990 not resulting in totally debilitating vertigo. She has lived in Oregon since that trip. She traveled across the US with her new boyfriend, making many stops along the way to see the country. She reports that taking the trip to "see America" was risky, but her preparations resulted in a successful trip and much joy from adding activities long absent from her life. This was made possible by a disciplined scheme over two years to increase her tolerance to travel without evoking the vertigo. The disease is not cured but her capacity is increased.

Chronic fatigue syndrome
Hillenbrand experienced the sudden onset of a then unknown sickness at 19. She was a sophomore at Kenyon College. Up until the symptoms struck, she was an avid tennis player, cycled in the nearby country, and played football on the quad. One day driving back to school from spring break, she became violently ill. Three days later, she could hardly sit up in bed and she could not make the walk to classes. "Terrified, confused, she dropped out of school" and her sister drove her home. She shuttled from doctor to doctor for a year before being diagnosed with chronic fatigue syndrome at Johns Hopkins. She said it was the most hellish year of her life. Because the name of her illness does not represent the extent of the disease, in 2011 Hillenbrand said of her diagnosis:This is why I talk about it. You can’t look at me and say I’m lazy or that this is someone who wants to avoid working. The average person who has this disease, before they got it, we were not lazy people; it’s very typical that people were Type A and hard, hard workers. I was that kind of person. I was working my tail off in college and loving it. It’s exasperating because of the name, which is condescending and so grossly misleading. Fatigue is what we experience, but it is what a match is to an atomic bomb. Hillenbrand's family and friends did not understand her sickness and pulled away, leaving Hillenbrand to battle an unknown disease on her own. She was met with ridicule and told she was lazy during the first ten years of her sickness. In 2014, she said, "'I was not taken seriously, and that was disastrous. If I’d gotten decent medical care to start out with — or at least emotional support, because I didn’t get that either — could I have gotten better? Would I not be sick 27 years later?'”

She described the onset and early years of her illness in an award-winning essay, A Sudden Illness in 2003. The disease structured her life as a writer, keeping her mainly confined to her home. She read old newspaper articles by buying the old newspapers or borrowing them from libraries, rather than using microfilm or other forms of archived news articles, and did all her live interviews by telephone.

On the irony of writing about physical paragons while being so incapacitated herself, Hillenbrand says, "I'm looking for a way out of here. I can't have it physically, so I'm going to have it intellectually. It was a beautiful thing to ride Seabiscuit in my imagination. And it's just fantastic to be there alongside Louie as he's breaking the NCAA mile record. People at these vigorous moments in their lives – it's my way of living vicariously."

In a 2014 interview, Bob Schieffer said to Laura Hillenbrand: To me your story – battling your disease ….is as compelling as his (Louis Zamperini’s) story. By the time of her January 2015 interview with Ken Rosen, her ability to function had improved after hitting a real low during the writing of Unbroken; she increased her ability to walk down her stairs by taking one step and returning to bed, then some days later, two steps, until she could go down the whole staircase, a process that took several months. When Rosen and his crew met her, she was not having trouble with her balance or with vertigo. When asked about her health, she reported having myalgic encephalomyelitis (M.E.), formerly called Chronic Fatigue Syndrome. 

In 2015–2016, she reported changes in her health status in an interview with Paul Costello for Stanford Medicine: "Recently, Hillenbrand has made a lot of changes in her medical treatments and in her life. There’s optimism in her voice and a sense of wonderment at new beginnings." Vertigo has been a serious problem for her, so that she had not left Washington D. C. since 1990 because of it. After a disciplined effort to tolerate riding in a car, starting at five minutes and increasing to two hours over two years, she was able to drive out of Washington D. C. after 25 years. She is not cured, "I was not well. I am not well. I am always dealing with symptoms," [emphasis in original]. The changes in her health allowed her to make a cross-country trip to Oregon. She has also begun horseback riding and bicycle riding, two activities she had not done since the disease struck her in 1987.

References

External links

Laura Hillenbrand 
Official website for Seabiscuit
Unbroken Official website

1967 births
Living people
People from Fairfax, Virginia
Kenyon College alumni
People with chronic fatigue syndrome
Bethesda-Chevy Chase High School alumni
21st-century American writers
Writers with disabilities
Writers from Oregon